The 1979 Romania rugby union tour of Wales was a series of five matches played by the Romania national rugby union team in Wales in September and October 1979. The Romanian team won four of their tour matches and lost the fifth, against a full-strength Welsh national side, by only a single point. Wales were the reigning Five Nations champions at the time although they designated their team Wales XV for the game and did not award full international caps.

Matches 
Scores and results list Romania's points tally first.

Touring party
Manager: Viorel Morariu
Assistant manager: Valeriu Irimescu
Captain: Gheorghe Dumitru

Backs

Dumitru Alexandru
Marian Aldea
Olimpiu Becheș
Mihai Bucos
Ion Constantin
Mihai Holban
Mircea Paraschiv
Eduard Suciu
Teodorin Tudose
Ion Zafiescu

Forwards

Pompiliu Borș
Ion Bucan
Gheorghe Caragea
Nicolae Cioarec
Constantin Dinu
Gheorghe Dumitru
Dan Florea
Marin Ionescu
Mircea Munteanu
Florică Murariu
Mircea Ortelecan
Ion Pintea
Corneliu Scarlat
Enciu Stoica

References

1979 rugby union tours
1979
1979
1979 in Romanian sport
1979–80 in Welsh rugby union
1979–80 in European rugby union